The Fleshlight is a brand of artificial vagina, oral, or anal sex toy. It is a masturbatory aid, which is used by inserting the penis into its opening.

Product history 

The Fleshlight was designed by Steve Shubin, who was granted a patent in July 1998 for his invention, as a "device for discreet sperm collection" and it is marketed by Interactive Life Forms. It is named for the flesh-like material used in its inner sleeve, as well as the plastic case that houses the sleeve, which is fashioned to look like an oversized flashlight. The inner sleeve is available with a vulva, anus or mouth orifice, in colors representing a variety of skin tones as well as see-through, and 48 different internal textures. Alongside their classic collection, Fleshlight also introduced the 'Freak' and 'Alien' collections, which modelled Fleshlight's on fantasy or sci-fi style designs that shied away from the conventional pornographic models traditionally used. In 2019 the Quickshot Launch was released.

Similar products 
The Fleshlight Girls brand consists of masturbation sleeves molded from the bodies of pornographic actresses. A device called the Fleshjack is a spinoff marketed to gay men. The Fleshjack Boys brand consists of masturbation sleeves and dildos molded from the bodies of gay pornographic actors. In 2017, Fleshlight collaborated with Dutch sex-tech manufacturer KIIROO to develop Fleshlight Launch, an interactive device that was able to move a Fleshlight sleeve, whilst also syncing with adult entertainment or corresponding female toys.

References

External links 

 

Sex toy manufacturers
Products introduced in 1998
American inventions
Male sex toys